Giovanni Bruno (born 30 January 1980) is an Italian footballer who plays as a defender. Bruno spent entire career in Lega Pro and Serie D. He spent 6 seasons in the Italian third highest level since 2004 (except for the 2006–07 season).

Career
Born in Carbonara di Bari, in the city of Bari, Apulia, Bruno started his career at local club A.S. Bari. He then spent 4 seasons in the Italian Serie D. With Pro Vasto he faced his first relegation in 2000. Bruno won promotion with Rutigliano as Group H playoffs winner in 2003. However the team were relegated back to non-professional football in 2004 from Serie C2.

He then moved to Frosinone of Serie C1, winning the promotion play-offs in 2006.

He did not follow the team to Serie B, but joined Cisco Roma of Serie C2. The club finished the season as the losing semifinalists in the promotion playoffs. He was sent off in the first leg of the first round (semi-final). The second leg was played by his understudy Marco Teani who also played 17 league games in the regular season.

In 2007, he joined Martina. In January 2008 he moved to Potenza.

In August 2008 he terminated his contract with Potenza and joined Reggiana. His team finished the season as the losing semifinalists in the promotion playoffs. He only played once in the playoffs, coming on as a substitute for Davide Scantamburlo.

In August 2009 he joined Como. He did not play any games in the 2010–11 season, and left for Barletta in January 2011, in exchange for Renato Dossena.

References

External links
 Barletta Profile 
 Football.it Profile 
 

Italian footballers
S.S.C. Bari players
Vastese Calcio 1902 players
Frosinone Calcio players
Atletico Roma F.C. players
Potenza S.C. players
A.C. Reggiana 1919 players
Como 1907 players
A.S.D. Barletta 1922 players
Association football fullbacks
Footballers from Bari
1980 births
Living people